Perfect Nightmare is a psychological thriller novel by John Saul, published by Ballantine Books on August 23, 2005. The novel follows the story of teenage Lindsay Marshall, who is abducted from her home while her family is in the process of selling it.

Plot
Every parent’s nightmare becomes reality for Kara Marshall when her daughter, Lindsay, vanishes from her bedroom during the night. The police suspect that the girl is just another moody teenage runaway, angry over leaving behind her school and friends because her family is moving. But Lindsay’s recent eerie claim, that someone invaded her room when the house was opened to prospective buyers, drives Kara to fear the worst: a nameless, faceless stalker has walked the halls of her home in search of more than a place to live.

Patrick Shields recognizes Kara’s pain, and carries plenty of his own since he lost his wife and two children in a devastating house fire. But more than grief draws Patrick and Kara together. He too senses the hand of a malevolent stranger in this tragedy. And as more people go missing from houses up for sale, Patrick’s suspicion, like Kara’s, blooms into horrified certainty.

Someone is trolling this peaceful community, undetected and undeterred, harvesting victims for a purpose no sane mind can fathom. Someone Kara and Patrick, alone and desperate, are determined to unmask. Someone who is even now watching, plotting, keeping a demented diary of unspeakable deeds, and waiting until the time is ripe for another fateful visit.

Reception
Critical reception for Perfect Nightmare was mixed. Publishers Weekly praised the novel, stating it was a "solid suspense". Bookreporter listed Perfect Nightmare as one of their "recommended" reads, writing that "If you haven't read him lately... PERFECT NIGHTMARE would be the perfect place to start". The Cullman Times wrote that some of the scenes were "raw and uncomfortable" and that the book's villain was "creepy".

The Lincoln Journal Star criticized the book, stating that while Saul was "imaginative, terrible, full of surprises" it was "Too bad he makes you wade through bad literature to get to the good parts". Kirkus Reviews also criticized Perfect Nightmare, writing that "Veteran suspense-monger Saul (Midnight Voices, 2002, etc.) manages to mess up the foolproof story of a family whose teenaged daughter is kidnapped".

References

American thriller novels
2005 American novels
Novels set in Long Island
Ballantine Books books